The Buraq (  "the lightning") is a heavenly equine in Islamic tradition that served as the mount of the Islamic prophet Muhammad during his Isra and Mi'raj journey from Mecca to Jerusalem and up through the heavens and back by night. The Buraq is also said to have transported certain prophets such as Abraham over long distances within a moment's duration.

Etymology 

The Encyclopaedia of Islam, referring to the writings of Al-Damiri (d.1405), considers al-burāq to be a derivative and adjective of  barq "lightning/emitted lightning" or various general meanings stemming from the verb: "to beam, flash, gleam, glimmer, glisten, glitter, radiate, shimmer, shine, sparkle, twinkle". According to Encyclopædia Iranica, "Boraq" is the Arabized form of "Middle Persian *barāg or *bārag, 'a riding beast, mount' (New Pers. bāra)".

Journey to the Seventh Heaven 
According to Islamic tradition, the Night Journey took place ten years after Muhammad announced his prophethood, during the 7th century. Muhammad had been in Mecca, at his cousin's home (the house of Fakhitah bint Abi Talib), when he went to al-masjid al-harām "the inviolable/sacred temple" (Al-Haram Mosque). While he was resting at the Kaaba, Gabriel appeared to him bringing the Buraq, which carried Muhammad in the archangel's company, to al-masjid al-aqṣá "the farthest/distant temple", traditionally held to be in Jerusalem and identified with the Holy Temple (Bayt Al-Maqdis).

After reaching Jerusalem he alighted from the Buraq, prayed on the site of the Temple, and then mounted it again as the creature ascended to the seven heavens where he met Adam, Jesus and his cousin Joseph, Enoch, Aaron, Moses and Abraham one by one until he reached the throne of God. God communicated with him giving him words and instructions, most importantly the commandment to Muslims to offer prayers, initially fifty times a day. At the urging of Moses, Muhammad returned to God several times before eventually reducing the number to five.

Abraham
According to Ibn Ishaq, the Buraq transported Abraham when he visited Hagar and Ishmael. Tradition states that Abraham lived with Sarah in Canaan but the Buraq would transport him in the morning to Mecca to see his family there and take him back in the evening.

Hadith 

Although the Hadith do not explicitly refer to the Buraq as having a human face, Near East and Persian art almost always portrays it so - a portrayal that found its way into Indian, Deccan and Persian Islamic art. This may have originated from an interpretation of the creature being described with a "beautiful face" as the face being human instead of bestial.

An excerpt from a translation of Sahih al-Bukhari describes Buraq:

Another excerpt describes the Buraq in greater detail:

In the earlier descriptions there is no agreement as to the sex of the Buraq. It is typically male, yet Ibn Sa'd has Gabriel address the creature as a female, and it was often rendered by painters and sculptors with a woman's head.  The idea that "al-Buraq" is simply a divine mare is also noted in the book The Dome of the Rock, in the chapter "The Open Court", and in the title-page vignette of Georg Ebers's Palestine in Picture and Word.

Western Wall
 
Various scholars and writers, such as ibn al-Faqih, ibn Abd Rabbih, and Abd al-Ghani al-Nabulsi, have suggested places where Buraq was supposedly tethered in stories, mostly locations near the southwest corner of the Haram. However, for several centuries the preferred location has been the al-Buraq Mosque, just inside the wall at the south end of the Western Wall Plaza. The mosque sits above an ancient passageway that once came out through the long-sealed Barclay's Gate whose huge lintel remains visible below the Maghrebi gate. Because of the proximity to the Western Wall, the area next to the wall has been associated with Buraq at least since the 19th century.

When a British Jew asked the Egyptian authorities in 1840 for permission to re-pave the ground in front of the Western Wall, the governor of Syria wrote:
 Carl Sandreczki, charged with compiling a list of place names for Charles William Wilson's Ordnance Survey of Jerusalem in 1865, reported that the street leading to the Western Wall, including the part alongside the wall, belonged to the Hosh (court/enclosure) of al Burâk, "not Obrâk, nor Obrat". In 1866, the Prussian Consul and Orientalist Georg Rosen wrote: "The Arabs call Obrâk the entire length of the wall at the wailing place of the Jews, southwards down to the house of Abu Su'ud and northwards up to the substructure of the Mechkemeh [Shariah court]. Obrâk is not, as was formerly claimed, a corruption of the word Ibri (Hebrews), but simply the neo-Arabic pronunciation of Bōrâk, ... which, whilst (Muhammad) was at prayer at the holy rock, is said to have been tethered by him inside the wall location mentioned above."

The name Hosh al Buraq appeared on the maps of Wilson's 1865 survey, its revised editions in 1876 and 1900, and other maps in the early 20th century. In 1922, the official Pro-Jerusalem Council specified it as a street name.

The association of the Western Wall area with Buraq has played an important role in disputes over the holy places since the British mandate.

For Muslims, the Wailing Wall (or Western Wall) is known as "Ḥā’iṭu ’l-Burāq" - "the Buraq Wall", for on the other side (the Muslim side of the Wailing Wall on the Temple Mount) is where Muhammad tied the Buraq, the riding animal upon which he rode during the Night of Ascension (Arabic:  Mi‘rāj). The wall links to the structure of the Al-Buraq Mosque.

Cultural impact 

 In Turkey, Burak is a common male name.
 Al-Boraq (Arabic: البُراق) is a 323-kilometre-long (201 mi) high-speed rail service between Casablanca and Tangier operated by ONCF in Morocco. The first of its kind on the African continent, and the fastest.
 Two airlines have been named after Buraq: Buraq Air of Libya, and the former Bouraq Indonesia Airlines of Indonesia (closed in 2006).
 el-Borak is a pirate in Rafael Sabatini's novel The Sea Hawk; El Borak is a character in short stories by Robert E. Howard.  Both are named for their speed and reflexes.
 Iran's Boragh armoured personnel carrier is named after it.
 Pakistan's NESCOM Burraq was named after the Buraq.
 A Bangladeshi Transport company is named Boraq Paribahan (বোরাক পরিবহন).
 A Malaysian petrol company is named Buraq Oil.
 Aceh, Indonesia, has adopted the image of a Buraq on the rampant in the proposed Aceh official seal.

See also

Notes

References

External links 

Islamic legendary creatures
Islamic eschatology
Animals in Islam
Mythological human hybrids